A roughing pump is any vacuum pump (typically mechanical) used to initially evacuate a vacuum system, as a first stage towards achieving high vacuum or ultra high vacuum.  The term "roughing pump" derives from the vacuum range it works in, "rough vacuum", above 1x10−3 torr (0.1 Pa). Pumps that operate in the high vacuum ranges typically don't operate, or only operate inefficiently, at atmospheric pressures, whereas pumps that work efficiently at atmospheric pressure usually cannot produce a vacuum lower than approximately 1x10−3 torr.  

One consideration for choosing a roughing pump is whether the pump uses lubricating oil that's exposed to the vacuum. This concern of "hydrocarbon backstreaming" where pump oil as a gas makes its way into the vacuum chamber, has led to oil-free pump designs on the market.

Types 
Two main types of roughing pumps are oil-sealed roughing pumps and dry roughing pumps. Within the two categories are various kinds of designs with differences among them based on maintenance issues, initial costs, pump lifespan and vacuum level. Early in their manufacture, dry pumps were significantly more expensive than oil-based pumps, however over time the cost gap has closed.

The advantages and disadvantages of each are as follow:

Sources 
 The Essentials of a Vacuum System, Hasina Jamal, University of Maryland

References
 Comparison of Roughing Pumps, Roy Schmaus, University of Alberta. Archived from the original on May 27, 2006.

Vacuum pumps